The 2006–07 Virginia Cavaliers men's basketball team represented the University of Virginia during the 2006–07 NCAA Division I men's basketball season. The team was led by second-year head coach Dave Leitao, and played their home games at John Paul Jones Arena in Charlottesville, Virginia as members of the Atlantic Coast Conference.

The Cavaliers began the season with the opening of the John Paul Jones Arena and an upset of then-#10 Arizona.  Despite returning all five starters from the previous campaign, the Cavaliers were picked to finish 8th place in the conference.  They went on to win a share of the ACC regular season championship with North Carolina and the second seed in the ACC tournament. Coach Dave Leitao was chosen as the ACC Coach of the Year following the conclusion of the regular season. Virginia received the fourth seed in the NCAA tournament's South Regional, where they beat Albany for their first NCAA tournament victory since 1995, but lost in the second round to fifth-seeded Tennessee.

Roster

Schedule 

|-
!colspan=9 style="background:#00214e; color:#f56d22;"| Exhibition game

|-
!colspan=9 style="background:#00214e; color:#f56d22;"| Regular season

|-
!colspan=9 style="background:#00214e; color:#f56d22;"| ACC Tournament

|-
!colspan=9 style="background:#00214e; color:#f56d22;"| NCAA tournament

References

Virginia Cavaliers men's basketball seasons
Virginia
Virginia
2006 in sports in Virginia
2007 in sports in Virginia